The  was a two-ship class of pre-dreadnought battleships built for the Imperial Japanese Navy in the late 1890s. As Japan lacked the industrial capacity to build such warships herself, they were designed and built in the UK. The ships participated in the Russo-Japanese War of 1904–1905, including the Battle of Port Arthur on the second day of the war. Hatsuse sank after striking two mines off Port Arthur in May 1904. Shikishima fought in the Battles of the Yellow Sea and Tsushima and was lightly damaged in the latter action, although shells prematurely exploded in the barrels of her main guns in each battle. The ship was reclassified as a coast defence ship in 1921 and served as a training ship for the rest of her career. She was disarmed and hulked in 1923 and finally broken up for scrap in 1948.

Design and description
Combat experience in the First Sino-Japanese War convinced the Imperial Japanese Navy of weaknesses in the Jeune Ecole naval philosophy, and Japan embarked on a program to modernize and expand its fleet. As with the earlier Fuji-class battleships, Japan lacked the technology and capability to construct its own battleships, and turned again to the United Kingdom. They were ordered as part of the Ten Year Naval Expansion Programme and paid for from the £30,000,000 indemnity paid by China after losing the Sino-Japanese War of 1894–1895.

The design of the Shikishima class was a modified and improved version of the s of the Royal Navy. They had the same armament and similar machinery as the Fuji class which was intended to allow them to work together as a homogenous group. They displaced  at normal load. The hull had a double bottom and was subdivided into 261 watertight compartments. The crew numbered about 741 officers and ratings, although this increased to 849 when serving as a flagship.

Propulsion
The ships were powered by two Humphrys Tennant vertical triple-expansion steam engines, each driving one propeller, using steam generated by 25 Belleville boilers. Shikishima reached a speed of  using .

Armament

The main battery of the Shikishima class consisted of the same four Elswick Ordnance Company 40-calibre twelve-inch guns as used in the Fuji class. They were mounted in twin-gun barbettes fore and aft of the superstructure that had armoured hoods to protect the guns and were usually called gun turrets. The hydraulically powered mountings could be loaded at all angles of traverse while the guns were loaded at a fixed angle of +13.5°.

Secondary armament of the Shikishima class consisted of fourteen 40-calibre Type 41 six-inch quick-firing guns mounted in casemates. Eight of these guns were positioned on the main deck on the side of the ship's hull and the other six guns were placed in the superstructure. Protection against torpedo boat attacks was provided by twenty QF 12-pounder 12 cwt guns and four  2.5-pounder Hotchkiss guns. The ships were also equipped with four submerged 18-inch torpedo tubes, two on each broadside.

Armour
The armour of the barbette hoods had a maximum thickness of  while their roofs were three inches thick. The casemates protecting the secondary armament were also six inches thick. This significantly improved the ships' protection as any shell that penetrated their vertical armour also had to penetrate the sloping deck before it could reach the machinery compartments or magazines. The forward conning tower was protected by 14 inches of armour, but the aft conning tower only had three inches of armour.

Ships

At the start of the Russo-Japanese War, Hatsuse and Shikishima were assigned to the 1st Division of the 1st Fleet. They participated in the Battle of Port Arthur on 9 February 1904 when Admiral Tōgō Heihachirō led the 1st Fleet in an attack on the Russian ships of the Pacific Squadron anchored just outside Port Arthur. Tōgō chose to attack the Russian coastal defences with his main armament and engage the Russian ships with his secondary guns. Splitting his fire proved to be a bad idea as the Japanese  and six-inch guns inflicted very little damage on the Russian ships who concentrated all their fire on the Japanese ships with some effect. Hatsuse was hit twice during the battle, 10 men being killed and 17 wounded, but Shikishima was only hit once with 17 men wounded.

Both ships participated in the action of 13 April when Tōgō successfully lured out two battleships of the Pacific Squadron. When the Russians spotted the five battleships of the 1st Division, they turned back for Port Arthur and the battleship  struck a minefield laid by the Japanese the previous night. It sank in less than two minutes after one of her magazines exploded. Emboldened by his success, Tōgō resumed long-range bombardment missions, which prompted the Russians to lay more minefields.

On 14 May, Hatsuse, Shikishima, and the battleship , the protected cruiser Kasagi, and the dispatch boat  put to sea to relieve the Japanese blockading force off Port Arthur. On the following morning, the squadron encountered a newly laid Russian minefield. Hatsuse struck one mine that disabled her steering and Yashima struck another when moving to assist Hatsuse. Hatsuse struck another mine while drifting about a half-hour later that detonated one of her magazines and the ship sank in a little over a minute. The catastrophe claimed 496 crewmen although the escorting ships were able to rescue 336 men.

Shikishima was not hit during the Battle of the Yellow Sea in August, although a shell exploded prematurely in one of her 12-inch guns, disabling it. During the Battle of Tsushima in May 1905, she was hit nine times; the most serious of which penetrated beneath a six-inch gun, killing or wounding the entire gun crew. Again the ship had another 12-inch shell prematurely detonate in one of the forward guns, wrecking it completely. Shikishima was reclassified as a first-class coast defence ship in September 1921, and was used for training duties in various capacities until disarmed and reclassified as a transport in 1923. Her hulk continued to be used as a training ship until she was scrapped in 1948.

Notes

Footnotes

References

External links

 Global Security site

Battleship classes
 
Ships with Belleville boilers